The Belarusian Athletics Championships is an annual outdoor track and field competition organised by the Belarusian Athletic Federation, which serves as the national championship for the sport in Belarus. The event was first held in 1992, following the dissolution of the Soviet Union.

Men

100 metres
1992: Sergey Kornelyuk
1993: Leonid Safronnikov
1994: 
1995: Sergey Kornelyuk
1996: Sergey Kornelyuk
1997: Sergey Kornelyuk
1998: Leonid Safronnikov
1999: Aleksandr Slyunkov
2000: Yuriy Rydevskiy
2001: Aleksandr Slyunkov
2002: Vyacheslav Aliyev
2003: Yuriy Bagatka
2004: Dmitriy Golub
2005: Maksim Piskunov
2006: Maksim Piskunov

200 metres
1992: Sergey Kornelyuk
1993: Leonid Safronnikov
1994: Leonid Safronnikov
1995: Sergey Kornelyuk
1996: Leonid Safronnikov
1997: 
1998: Dmitriy Kotenkov
1999: Aleksandr Slyunkov
2000: ?
2001: Aleksandr Slyunkov
2002: Vitaliy Chechetko
2003: Maksim Piskunov
2004: Maksim Sidorenko
2005: Maksim Piskunov
2006: Maksim Piskunov

400 metres
1992: Sergey Molchan
1993: Sergey Molchan
1994: Sergey Molchan
1995: Aleksandr Titov
1996: Dmitriy Kotenkov
1997: Dmitriy Nesterenko
1998: Sergey Kozlov
1999: Andrey Kudryavtsev
2000: Sergey Kozlov
2001: Sergey Kozlov
2002: Maksim Sidorenko
2003: Sergey Kozlov
2004: Sergey Kozlov
2005: Sergey Kozlov
2006: Sergey Kozlov

800 metres
1992: Andrey Shimanskiy
1993: Ivan Komar
1994: Ivan Komar
1995: Anatoliy Butkovskiy
1996: 
1997: Sergey Yakovlev
1998: Ivan Komar
1999: Aleksandr Trutko
2000: Pavel Pelepyagin
2001: Aleksandr Trutko
2002: Pavel Pelepyagin
2003: Mark Romanchuk
2004: Aleksandr Trutko
2005: Aleksandr Trutko
2006:

1500 metres
1992: Vadim Polyakov
1993: Andrey Gorbatsevich
1994: Ivan Komar
1995: Azat Rakipov
1996: Vladimir Dukhovich
1997: Vasiliy Sanko
1998: Aleksandr Lukashenko
1999: Vladimir Dukhovich
2000: Azat Rakipov
2001: Mark Romanchuk
2002: Andrey Degtyarov
2003: Aleksandr Donchenko
2004: Aleksandr Busel
2005: Mark Romanchuk
2006: Andrey Korotko

5000 metres
1992: I. Mazepa
1993: Oleg Savelyev
1994: Aleksey Tarasyuk
1995: 
1996: Sergey Dubina
1997: ?
1998: Sergey Dubina
1999: Sergey Dubina
2000: Azat Rakipov
2001: Dmitriy Dobovskiy
2002: Yuriy Baltsevich
2003: Igor Teteryukov
2004: Igor Teteryukov
2005: Aleksandr Donchenko
2006: Andrey Gordeyev

10,000 metres
1992: Oleg Savelyev
1993: Yuriy Brandes
1994: Azat Rakipov
1995: Vladimir Tonchinskiy
1996: Zorislav Gapeyenko
1997: ?
1998: Zorislav Gapeyenko
1999: Vladimir Tyamchik
2000: ?
2001: Zorislav Gapeyenko
2002: Dmytro Baranovskyy
2003: Viktor Lomonosov
2004: Igor Teteryukov
2005: Ruslan Sadovskiy
2006: Igor Teteryukov

3000 metres steeplechase
1992: Vasiliy Omelyusik
1993: Aleksey Tarasyuk
1994: Vasiliy Omelyusik
1995: Aleksey Tarasyuk
1996: Vasiliy Omelyusik
1997: ?
1998: Igor Zhavoronok
1999: Igor Zhavoronok
2000: ?
2001: Igor Zhavoronok
2002: Igor Zhavoronok
2003: ?
2004: Pavel Dranitsa
2005: Vitaliy Piskun
2006: Sergey Berdnik

110 metres hurdles
1992: Dmitriy Sereda
1993: Sergey Usov
1994: Mikhail Ryabukhin
1995: 
1996: Igor Borisov
1997: Igor Borisov
1998: Igor Borisov
1999: Sergey Khodanovich
2000: ?
2001: Dmitriy Sereda
2002: Sergey Khodanovich
2003: Maksim Linsha
2004: Andrey Shalonko
2005: Maksim Linsha
2006: Maksim Linsha

400 metres hurdles
1992: Valeriy Dauksha
1993: Igor Kurochkin
1994: Aleksey Fursa
1995: Igor Kurochkin
1996: Igor Lisitsin
1997: Leonid Vershinin
1998: Leonid Vershinin
1999: Leonid Vershinin
2000: ?
2001: Leonid Vershinin
2002: Yevgeniy Mikheyko
2003: Leonid Vershinin
2004: Leonid Vershinin
2005: Leonid Vershinin
2006: Leonid Vershinin

High jump
1992: Vladimir Zaboronyok
1993: Oleg Zhukovskiy
1994: Nikolay Moskalev
1995: 
1996: Aleksandr Buglakov
1997: Oleg Vorobey
1998: Oleg Vorobey
1999: Aleksey Lesnichiy
2000: Oleg Prokopov
2001: Aleksey Lesnichiy
2002: Aleksey Lesnichiy
2003: Aliaksandr Viarutsin
2004: Henadz Maroz
2005: Aliaksandr Viarutsin
2006: Aliaksandr Viarutsin

Pole vault
1992: Andrei Tivontchik
1993: Konstantin Semyonov
1994: Gennadiy Sidorov
1995: Gennadiy Sidorov
1996: Gennadiy Sidorov
1997: Igor Kravtsov
1998: Dmitriy Smirnov
1999: Dmitriy Smirnov
2000: ?
2001: Dmitriy Smirnov
2002: ?
2003: Stanislav Tivontchik
2004: Igor Alekseyev
2005: Igor Alekseyev
2006: Igor Alekseyev

Long jump
1992: Andrey Nikulin
1993: Viktor Rudenik
1994: Andrey Nikulin
1995: Viktor Rudenik
1996: Aleksandr Kravchenko
1997: ?
1998: Aleksandr Glavatskiy
1999: Andrey Mikhalkevich
2000: Andrey Shablovskiy
2001: Gennadiy Puzikov
2002: Gennadiy Puzikov
2003: Andrey Shablovskiy
2004: Maksim Nesteruk
2005: Aleksey Postupailo
2006: Maksim Nesteruk

Triple jump
1992: Andrey Zirko
1993: Oleg Denishchik
1994: Viktor Sazankov
1995: Viktor Sazankov
1996: Viktor Sazankov
1997: Viktor Sazankov
1998: Aleksandr Glavatskiy
1999: Viktor Sazankov
2000: Dmitriy Vasilyev
2001: Aleksandr Glavatskiy
2002: Dmitrij Vaľukevič
2003: Aleksandr Furso
2004: Andrey Yakovchik
2005: Dzmitry Dziatsuk
2006: Aleksandr Vorobey

Shot put
1992: Mikhail Kostin
1993: Aleksandr Klimov
1994: Dmitriy Goncharuk
1995: Aleksandr Klimov
1996: Dzimitry Hancharuk
1997: Dzimitry Hancharuk
1998: Viktor Bulat
1999: Viktor Bulat
2000: Andrei Mikhnevich
2001: Pavel Lyzhyn
2002: Yury Bialou
2003: Dzimitry Hancharuk
2004: Pavel Lyzhyn
2005: Andrei Mikhnevich
2006: Andrei Mikhnevich

Discus throw
1992: Vasiliy Kaptyukh
1993: Vladimir Dubrovshchik
1994: Vladimir Dubrovshchik
1995: Vladimir Dubrovshchik
1996: Vladimir Dubrovshchik
1997: Leonid Cherevko
1998: Leonid Cherevko
1999: Vladimir Dubrovshchik
2000: Leonid Cherevko
2001: Aliaksandr Malashevich
2002: Leonid Cherevko
2003: Vasiliy Kaptyukh
2004: Vasiliy Kaptyukh
2005: 
2006: Aliaksandr Malashevich

Hammer throw
1992: Vitaliy Alisevich
1993: Sergey Alay
1994: Vitaliy Alisevich
1995: Konstantin Astapkovich
1996: Mikhail Popel
1997: Igor Astapkovich
1998: Konstantin Astapkovich
1999: Konstantin Astapkovich
2000: Vadim Devyatovskiy
2001: Ivan Tsikhan
2002: Ivan Tsikhan
2003: Ivan Tsikhan
2004: Ivan Tsikhan
2005: Ivan Tsikhan
2006: Vadim Devyatovskiy

Javelin throw
1992: ?
1993: Nikolay Kosyanok
1994: Oleg Gotsko
1995: Sergey Gordienko
1996: Andrey Khodasevich
1997: Vladimir Sasimovich
1998: Aleksandr Kulesh
1999: Igor Lisovskiy
2000: Vladimir Sasimovich
2001: Pavel Stasyuk
2002: Pavel Stasyuk
2003: Vladimir Sasimovich
2004: 
2005: Nikolay Vasilyachov
2006: Vadim Yautukhovich

Decathlon
1992: Aleksandr Zhdanovich
1993: Aleksandr Zhdanovich
1994: Yuriy Lekunovich
1995: Dmitriy Sukhomazov
1996: Mikhail Volk
1997: Mikhail Volk
1998: Dmitriy Sukhomazov
1999: Gennadiy Sitkevich
2000: ?
2001: Aliaksandr Parkhomenka
2002: Aliaksandr Parkhomenka
2003: Aliaksandr Parkhomenka
2004: Valeriy Poklad
2005: Aleksandr Korzun
2006: Aliaksandr Parkhomenka

20 kilometres walk
The race was held on a track in 1998, 1999, 2000 and 2006.
1993: Yevgeniy Misyulya
1994: Mikhail Khmelnitskiy
1995: Viktor Ginko
1996: ?
1997: ?
1998: Vitaliy Gordey
1999: 
2000: Vitaliy Gordey
2001: ?
2002: Ivan Trotski
2003: Andrey Makarov
2004: Andrey Talashko
2005: Andrey Talashko
2006: Andrey Talashko

50 kilometres walk
1993: Viktor Ginko

Women

100 metres
1992: Natalya Zhuk
1993: Yelena Denishchik
1994: Natallia Safronnikava
1995: Natallia Safronnikava
1996: Natallia Safronnikava
1997: Natallia Safronnikava
1998: Natallia Safronnikava
1999: Natallia Safronnikava
2000: Tatyana Barashko
2001: Aksana Drahun
2002: Yulia Nestsiarenka
2003: Alena Newmyarzhytskaya
2004: Aksana Drahun
2005: Natallia Solohub
2006: Alena Newmyarzhytskaya

200 metres
1992: Natalya Zhuk
1993: Yelena Denishchik
1994: Margarita Molchan
1995: Natallia Safronnikava
1996: Natallia Safronnikava
1997: Natallia Safronnikava
1998: Natallia Safronnikava
1999: Natallia Solohub
2000: ?
2001: Natalya Abramenko
2002: Natallia Safronnikava
2003: Alena Newmyarzhytskaya
2004: Natallia Solohub
2005: Natallia Solohub
2006: Natalya Abramenko

400 metres
1992: Natalya Ignatyuk
1993: Irina Skvarchevskaya
1994: Anna Kozak
1995: Anna Kozak
1996: Anna Kozak
1997: Anna Kozak
1998: Anna Kozak
1999: Natallia Solohub
2000: Natallia Solohub
2001: Anna Kozak
2002: Sviatlana Usovich
2003: Iryna Khliustava
2004: Iryna Khliustava
2005: Anna Kozak
2006: Ilona Usovich

800 metres
1992: Natalya Dukhnova
1993: Natalya Dukhnova
1994: Yelena Bychkovskaya
1995: Yelena Bychkovskaya
1996: Natalya Dukhnova
1997: Yelena Konchits
1998: Viktoriya Lysakova
1999: Natalya Dukhnova
2000: Tatyana Buloychik
2001: Natalya Vasko
2002: Natalya Dedkova
2003: Natalya Dukhnova
2004: Irina Pechennikova
2005: Svetlana Klimkovich
2006: Svetlana Klimkovich

1500 metres
1992: Oksana Mernikova
1993: Oksana Mernikova
1994: Yelena Bychkovskaya
1995: Yelena Bychkovskaya
1996: Natalya Dukhnova
1997: Yelena Bychkovskaya
1998: Alesia Turava
1999: Natalya Dukhnova
2000: Tatyana Buloychik
2001: Svetlana Klimkovich
2002: ?
2003: Svetlana Klimkovich
2004: Anastasiya Starovoytova
2005: Volha Krautsova
2006: Svetlana Klimkovich

3000 metres
1992: Tatyana Nefedeva
1993: Galina Baruk
1994: Alena Mazouka
1995: Not held
1996: Not held
1997: Not held
1998: Not held
1999: Not held
2000: Not held
2001: Svetlana Klimkovich
2002: Svetlana Klimkovich

5000 metres
1995: Tatyana Nefedeva
1996: Tatyana Nefedeva
1997: ?
1998: Yelena Tolstygina
1999: Alena Mazouka
2000: ?
2001: Alina Taustyhina
2002: ?
2003: Tatyana Belkina
2004: Volha Krautsova
2005: Irina Kunakhovets
2006: Anastasiya Starovoytova

10,000 metres
1992: Galina Baruk
1993: Yelena Vinitskaya
1994: Alena Mazouka
1995: Alena Mazouka
1996: Alena Mazouka
1997: Alena Mazouka
1998: Halina Karnatsevich
1999: Alena Mazouka
2000: Oksana Vasylevska
2001: Alina Taustyhina
2002: Natalya Vasilevskaya
2003: Alena Mazouka
2004: 
2005: Halina Karnatsevich
2006: Volha Krautsova

2000 metres steeplechase
1995: Yelena Grishko
1996: Tereza Barkovskaya
1997: ?
1998: Yelena Grishko
1999: Inna Ruklo

3000 metres steeplechase
2000: ?
2001: Inna Ruklo
2002: ?
2003: ?
2004: Natalya Grigoryeva
2005: Natalya Grigoryeva
2006: Alesia Turava

100 metres hurdles
1992: Svetlana Buraga
1993: Svetlana Buraga
1994: Lidiya Yurkova
1995: Lidiya Yurkova
1996: Tamara Podretskaya
1997: Tamara Kadyrova
1998: Taisiya Dobrovitskaya
1999: Tatyana Ledovskaya
2000: Taisiya Dobrovitskaya
2001: Yevgeniya Likhuta
2002: Yevgeniya Likhuta
2003: Yevgeniya Likhuta
2004: Yevgeniya Likhuta
2005: Yevgeniya Likhuta
2006: Yevgeniya Likhuta

400 metres hurdles
1992: Tatyana Kurochkina
1993: Tatyana Kurochkina
1994: Natalya Ignatyuk
1995: Tatyana Ledovskaya
1996: Tatyana Ledovskaya
1997: Tatyana Ledovskaya
1998: Tatyana Kurochkina
1999: Tatyana Kurochkina
2000: Tatyana Kurochkina
2001: Tatyana Kurochkina
2002: Tatyana Kurochkina
2003: Inna Kalinina
2004: Inna Kalinina
2005: Inna Kalinina
2006: Kristina Vedernikova

High jump
1992: Tatsiana Sheuchyk
1993: Galina Isachenko
1994: Tatsiana Sheuchyk
1995: Tatyana Gulevich
1996: Tatyana Khramova
1997: Tatyana Khramova
1998: Tatyana Gulevich
1999: Tatyana Gulevich
2000: Tatsiana Sheuchyk
2001: Tatyana Gulevich
2002: Tatyana Gulevich
2003: Olga Klimova
2004: Olga Chuprova
2005: Irina Chuyko
2006: Alesya Gerasimova

Pole vault
1997: Galina Isachenko
1998: Galina Isachenko
1999: Yuliya Taratynova
2000: ?
2001: Svetlana Makarevich
2002: Yuliya Taratynova
2003: Yekaterina Arkhipova
2004: Nadezhda Fiyalo
2005: Yekaterina Arkhipova
2006: Yuliya Taratynova

Long jump
1992: Olga Roslyakova
1993: Anzhela Atroschenko
1994: Larisa Kuchinskaya
1995: Larisa Kuchinskaya
1996: Natallia Sazanovich
1997: Yelena Lemeshevskaya
1998: Larisa Kuchinskaya
1999: Larisa Kuchinskaya
2000: Natallia Safronava
2001: Irina Chernushenko
2002: Irina Chernushenko
2003: Irina Chernushenko
2004: Anzhela Zhalnerchik
2005: Anzhela Zhalnerchik
2006: Natallia Safronava

Triple jump
1992: Yelena Stakhova
1993: Yelena Stakhova
1994: Natallia Safronava
1995: Zhanna Gureyeva
1996: Yelena Stakhova
1997: Zhanna Gureyeva
1998: Natallia Safronava
1999: Zhanna Gureyeva
2000: Natallia Safronava
2001: Natallia Safronava
2002: Natallia Safronava
2003: Natallia Safronava
2004: Olesya Lesun
2005: Olesya Lesun
2006: Natallia Safronava

Shot put
1992: Tatyana Khorkhuleva
1993: Natalya Gurskaya
1994: Natalya Gurskaya
1995: Natalya Gurskaya
1996: Tatyana Khorkhuleva
1997: Yanina Karolchyk-Pravalinskaya
1998: Yanina Karolchyk-Pravalinskaya
1999: Nadzeya Astapchuk
2000: Nadzeya Astapchuk
2001: Natallia Mikhnevich
2002: Yelena Ivanenko
2003: Yelena Ivanenko
2004: Natallia Mikhnevich
2005: Natallia Mikhnevich
2006: Natallia Mikhnevich

Discus throw
1992: Lyudmila Filimonova
1993: Ellina Zvereva
1994: Lyudmila Filimonova
1995: Lyudmila Filimonova
1996: Lyudmila Filimonova
1997: Iryna Yatchenko
1998: Lyudmila Filimonova
1999: Ellina Zvereva
2000: Lyudmila Starovoytova
2001: Lyudmila Starovoytova
2002: Lyudmila Starovoytova
2003: Iryna Yatchenko
2004: Iryna Yatchenko
2005: Ellina Zvereva
2006: Ellina Zvereva

Hammer throw
1992: Sviatlana Sudak Torun
1993: Sviatlana Sudak Torun
1994: Sviatlana Sudak Torun
1995: Sviatlana Sudak Torun
1996: Lyudmila Gubkina
1997: Sviatlana Sudak Torun
1998: Sviatlana Sudak Torun
1999: Sviatlana Sudak Torun
2000: Lyudmila Gubkina
2001: Tatyana Gromada
2002: Volha Tsander
2003: Volha Tsander
2004: Volha Tsander
2005: Volha Tsander
2006: Volha Tsander

Javelin throw
1992: ?
1993: Tatyana Shikolenko
1994: Natalya Yermolovich
1995: Alina Serdyuk
1996: Alina Serdyuk
1997: ?
1998: Oksana Velichko
1999: Alina Serdyuk
2000: ?
2001: Oksana Velichko
2002: Galina Kakhova
2003: Marina Novik
2004: Natalya Shimchuk
2005: Natalya Shimchuk
2006: Natalya Shimchuk

Heptathlon
1992: Taisiya Dobrovitskaya
1993: Taisiya Dobrovitskaya
1994: Anzhela Andrukevich
1995: Anzhela Andrukevich
1996: Natallia Sazanovich
1997: Svetlana Buraga
1998: Taisiya Dobrovitskaya
1999: Taisiya Dobrovitskaya
2000: ?
2001: Taisiya Dobrovitskaya
2002: Iryna Butar
2003: ?
2004: Tatyana Alisevich
2005: Tatyana Alisevich
2006: Tatyana Zhaunova

10 kilometres walk
The event was held on a track from 1997 to 2000.
1993: Valentina Tsybulskaya
1994: Valentina Tsybulskaya
1995: Olga Kardopoltseva
1996: ?
1997: Lyudmila Dolgopolova
1998: Larisa Ramazanova
1999: Valentina Tsybulskaya
2000: Ryta Turava

20 kilometres walk
The event was held on a track in 2006.
2001: ?
2002: ?
2003: Lyudmila Dolgopolova
2004: Elena Ginko
2005: 
2006: Elena Ginko

References

Champions 1992–2006
Belarusian Championships. GBR Athletics. Retrieved 2021-02-06.

Winners
 List
Belarusian Championships
Athletics